Haiti competed at the 2000 Summer Olympics in Sydney, Australia. The Haitian team consisted of five competitors: three track and field athletes, one judoka, and one tennis player.

Athletics 

Men
Track & road events

Women
Track & road events

Judo

Tennis

Women

See also
Haiti at the 1999 Pan American Games

References

Wallechinsky, David (2004). The Complete Book of the Summer Olympics (Athens 2004 Edition). Toronto, Canada. . 
International Olympic Committee (2001). The Results. Retrieved 12 November 2005.
Sydney Organising Committee for the Olympic Games (2001). Official Report of the XXVII Olympiad Volume 1: Preparing for the Games. Retrieved 20 November 2005.
Sydney Organising Committee for the Olympic Games (2001). Official Report of the XXVII Olympiad Volume 2: Celebrating the Games. Retrieved 20 November 2005.
Sydney Organising Committee for the Olympic Games (2001). The Results. Retrieved 20 November 2005.
International Olympic Committee Web Site
sports-reference

Nations at the 2000 Summer Olympics
2000 Summer Olympics
Summer Olympics